Huang Shih-Feng (born 2 March 1992) is a Taiwanese track and field athlete who competes in the javelin throw.

He won the gold medal at the 2015 Asian Athletics Championships and represented his country at the 2014 Asian Games. Huang was World Youth Champion in 2009.

Career
Huang initially played association football as a child, but after the school team was disbanded he took up athletics around the age of 14. He continued with both sport and study, beginning a degree at Fu Jen Catholic University. He had his first international success in the youth category of the sport: entering the 2009 World Youth Championships in Athletics as a rank outsider, he surprised by topping the qualification with a throw of  – a two-metre improvement on his lifetime best at that point. He reached the 74-metre mark in the final and declared himself shocked to have claimed the gold medal over Killian Durechou of France. He stepped up to the junior category the following year and managed a bronze medal at the 2010 Asian Junior Athletics Championships, behind his compatriot Cheng Chao-Tsun. He was unable to repeat global success at the 2010 World Junior Championships in Athletics, finishing the qualification round without a single valid mark.

He represented his nation at the 2013 Summer Universiade, placing 13th in the final. He ranked third among Asian throwers that year, behind Zhao and Ivan Zaytsev.

He began 2014 with a win at the Golden Grand Prix in Tokyo, but his mark of  proved to be his season's best. He threw nearly seven metres less at the 2014 Asian Games and finished down in ninth as a result. A throw of  proved sufficient to hold off both Uzbek Bobur Shokirjonov and Japan's Yukifumi Murakami at the 2015 Asian Athletics Championships, earning Huang his first major senior title. He was the first Taiwanese to win an Asian title in the javelin throw at either the Asian Athletics Championships or the Asian Games.

International competitions

Seasonal progression
2010: 
2011: 
2012: 
2013:  
2014: 
2015: 
2016: 
'''2017: 
2018:

References

External links

Living people
1992 births
Taiwanese male javelin throwers
Asian Games competitors for Chinese Taipei
Athletes (track and field) at the 2014 Asian Games
Athletes (track and field) at the 2018 Asian Games
Fu Jen Catholic University alumni
World Athletics Championships athletes for Chinese Taipei
Athletes (track and field) at the 2016 Summer Olympics
Olympic athletes of Taiwan
Universiade medalists in athletics (track and field)
Universiade silver medalists for Chinese Taipei
Universiade bronze medalists for Chinese Taipei
Medalists at the 2017 Summer Universiade
Athletes (track and field) at the 2020 Summer Olympics